The Embassy Theatre is a historic theatre building located on South Main Street in Lewistown, Mifflin County, Pennsylvania.  It is a 1927 motion picture / vaudeville theatre, and is an excellent surviving example of theatre architecture of the 1920s. The original National Theatre building was built in 1916, and gutted in 1927 to be rebuilt as the Embassy. The front facade features eclectic Colonial Revival details.  It has a rectangular marquee measuring 33 feet, 6 inches, by 10 feet, 6 inches, overall. The theatre closed in 1981, and is currently non operational and is undergoing restoration.

It was added to the National Register of Historic Places in 1998.

See also 
 National Register of Historic Places listings in Mifflin County, Pennsylvania

References

External links

Embassy Theatre website
Recent Photos of the Embassy Theatre by Matt Lambros

Theatres on the National Register of Historic Places in Pennsylvania
Theatres completed in 1927
Colonial Revival architecture in Pennsylvania
Theatres in Pennsylvania
Buildings and structures in Mifflin County, Pennsylvania
National Register of Historic Places in Mifflin County, Pennsylvania